The Milltown International Bridge is an international bridge and the main link of the Calais–Milltown Border Crossing, which connects St. Stephen, New Brunswick, in Canada and Calais, Maine, in the United States, across the St. Croix River.

It does not allow commercial traffic and is the smallest and least busy of the three border crossings between St. Stephen and Calais. The others are:

Border crossing

The Calais - Milltown Border Crossing connects the towns of Calais, Maine and St. Stephen, New Brunswick on the Canada–US border at the Milltown International Bridge. Canada built its border crossing station in 1967.  The US border station was built in 1938 and was rebuilt in 2014.

References

Road bridges in New Brunswick
Canada–United States bridges
International bridges in Maine
Buildings and structures in Calais, Maine
St. Stephen, New Brunswick
Road bridges in Maine
Transportation buildings and structures in Washington County, Maine